Brachydiastematherium transylvanicum (literally "short Diastema Beast of Transylvania") is the westernmost species of brontothere, with the first fossils of it being found in Transylvania, Romania.  In comparison with other brontothere fossils, it is suggested that B. transylvanicum would have had an elongated head, not unlike Dolichorhinus, and be about 2 meters at the withers (anatomically speaking, the highest part of the back at the base of the neck).

Phylogeny 
Cladogram after Mihlbachler (2008):

References 

Brontotheres
Prehistoric mammals of Europe
Fossil taxa described in 1876